Classic Christmas is an album of Christmas music by the country music singer Billy Gilman, released in 2000 on Epic Records. It was certified Gold by the RIAA. "Warm & Fuzzy" was released as a single and reached #50 on the Billboard Country chart.

Track listing 
"White Christmas" — 4:06
"Warm & Fuzzy" — 3:14
"Winter Wonderland" – 2:43
"The Christmas Song" – 4:01
"There's a New Kid in Town" – 4:13
"Jingle Bell Rock" – 2:15
"Rockin' Around the Christmas Tree" – 2:18
"Angels We Have Heard on High" – 2:54
"Silent Night"– 2:25
"Away in a Manger" – 2:36
"Sleigh Ride" – 2:30
duet with Charlotte Church
"O Holy Night" – 3:56

Personnel

Charts

Weekly charts

Year end charts

Certifications and sales

References

2000 Christmas albums
Billy Gilman albums
Epic Records albums
Albums produced by David Malloy
Christmas albums by American artists
Country Christmas albums